Neil Battye (born 11 August 1963) is an English former professional rugby league footballer who played in the 1980s and 1990s.

Background
Neil Battye was born in Dewsbury, West Riding of Yorkshire, England

Playing career

County Cup Final appearances
Neil Battye played left-, i.e. number 11, (replaced by interchange/substitute Martin Ketteridge) in Castleford's 11-8 victory over Wakefield Trinity in the 1990 Yorkshire County Cup Final during the 1990–91 season at Elland Road, Leeds on Sunday 23 September 1990, and played left-, and scored a try in the 28-6 victory over Bradford Northern in the 1991 Yorkshire County Cup Final during the 1991–92 season at Elland Road, Leeds on Sunday 20 October 1991.

Club career
Neil Battye made his début for Castleford in the 46-22 victory over Featherstone Rovers on Sunday 21 August 1983, he was transferred from Castleford to Leeds, he was transferred from Leeds to the Featherstone Rovers, he made his début for the Featherstone Rovers on 22 January 1995, and he played his last match for the Featherstone Rovers during the 1994–95 season.

References

External links
Neil Battye Memory Box Search at archive.castigersheritage.com

1963 births
Living people
Castleford Tigers players
English rugby league players
Featherstone Rovers players
Leeds Rhinos players
Rugby league players from Dewsbury
Rugby league second-rows